Oede de la Couroierie (died 1294), also known as Eude de Carigas and Odo de Corigiaria, was a trouvère of Artois. He is documented beginning in 1270 as a clerk in the house of Count Robert II, who often sent him on diplomatic missions. He served Robert until his death. His will, made in June 1294, providing for both a mistress with her two children and his widow with her three. His will calls him both Odon de Paris and Odon de Saint-Germain. He was probably born in the Île-de-France, near Paris.

Songs and their models
All five of Oede's known songs are modelled after the songs of others. 
Chançon ferai par grant desesperance, modelled after the anonymous Au repairier que je fis de Provence
Desconfortés com cil qui est sans joie, modelled after Gace Brulé, Desconfortés plain d'ire et de pesance
Ma derreniere veul fere en chantant, modelled after Raoul de Soissons, Rois de Navarre et sire de virtu
Tout soit mes cuers en grant desesperance, modelled after Gace Brulé, Desconfortés plain d'ire et de pesance
Trop ai longuement fait grant consirvance, modelled after Blondel de Nesle, A l'entrant d'esté

References
Falck, Robert. "Oede de la Couroierie." Grove Music Online. Oxford Music Online. Accessed 20 September 2008.

1294 deaths
Trouvères
French diplomats
Year of birth unknown
Male classical composers